Hylomus is a genus of millipede of the family Paradoxosomatidae found in southeast Asia.

Species

References 

Paradoxosomatidae
Millipede genera